Raymond Strasser (born 14 September 1930) is a Luxembourgian wrestler. He competed in the men's Greco-Roman featherweight at the 1948 Summer Olympics.

References

External links
 

1930 births
Living people
Luxembourgian male sport wrestlers
Olympic wrestlers of Luxembourg
Wrestlers at the 1948 Summer Olympics
People from Differdange